The 2008–09 season of the División de Honor B de Balonmano is the 15th season of second-tier handball in Spain.

Final standings

Playoffs for promotion

Semifinals

Final

External links
Scores and Standings

División de Plata de Balonmano seasons
2008–09 in Spanish handball